Abdul Khalik Juad, also known as Abdul Kalik Mohamed Jawad (born 9 November 1930) was a weight-lifter who represented Iraq at the 1964 Summer Olympics in Tokyo.

References

Olympic weightlifters of Iraq
Weightlifters at the 1964 Summer Olympics
Iraqi male weightlifters
1930 births
Possibly living people
20th-century Iraqi people